Max Turner may refer to:
Max Turner (theologian), British New Testament scholar
Max Turner (politician) (born 1947), Australian politician, former member for Bendigo West
Max Turner (footballer) (1911–1960), Australian footballer for Collingwood
Max Turner (Coronation Street), a fictional character
Max Turner (musician) (born 1980), Scottish-German vocalist, producer and songwriter

Website : www.MaxTurner.com